HMS E29 was a British E class submarine built by Armstrong Whitworth, Newcastle-Upon-Tyne. She was launched on 1 June 1915 and commissioned in October 1915. E29 suffered an explosion in the battery compartment which killed four men on 9 January 1916. E29 was sold on 21 February 1922.

Design
She was powered by two  Vickers eight-cylinder two-stroke diesel engines and two  electric motors.

E21 was armed with a 12-pounder  QF gun mounted forward of the conning tower. She had five 18 inch (450 mm) torpedo tubes, two in the bow, one either side amidships, and one in the stern; a total of 10 torpedoes were carried.

E-Class submarines had wireless systems with  power ratings; in some submarines, these were later upgraded to  systems by removing a midship torpedo tube. Their maximum design depth was  although in service some reached depths of below . Some submarines contained Fessenden oscillator systems.

Crew
Her complement was three officers and 28 men.

References

Bibliography
 

 

British E-class submarines of the Royal Navy
Ships built on the River Tyne
1915 ships
World War I submarines of the United Kingdom
Royal Navy ship names
Ships built by Armstrong Whitworth